Being Osama is a 2004 documentary about how the lives of men named "Osama" changed in the aftermath of the September 11 attacks.

It was produced by Tim Schwab and Mahmoud Kaabour. Director Kaabour is the founder and managing director of Veritas Films, now based in the United Arab Emirates. Co-director Schwab is an associate professor of film at Montreal's Concordia University.

Synopsis
The documentary details the lives of six Montreal Arab men, all with the first name "Osama":

 Osama (Sam) Shalabi, of Egyptian origin, a music composer who grew up in Atlantic Canada. He is a leading member of the Montreal-based instrumental band, Shalabi Effect. He composed the soundtrack for Being Osama.
 Ossama al-Sarraf (better known as Sultan), a Christian Palestinian Canadian DJ who wears dreadlocks. He is one half of the DJ duo, Sultan + Ned Shepard.
 Ossama el-Naggar, an Egyptian Canadian musical expert and importer of opera and classical music CDs living in Canada for over twenty years
 Osama el-Demerdash, an Egyptian, who is very politically active regarding issues surrounding immigrant rights and deportation of refugees
 Oussama al-Jundi, a Lebanese Canadian who runs a Muslim school in Montreal
 Osama Dorias, an Iraqi Canadian and devout Muslim whose family fled Saddam Hussein's regime while he will still a young child. His father has recently returned to Iraq, and portrayed as a university graduate and a basketball player, involved in organising a Muslim basketball league in a Montreal suburb.

They all recount their experiences in the wake of the terrorist attacks of September 11, 2001.

Reception and distribution
The film has been recognised as a contribution to the intellectual and artistic debate about the Arab diaspora.

Kaabour presented it in a two-hour special on the Zaven Kouyoumdjian pan Arab talk show "Seereh w Enfatahit" (Arabic سيرة وانفتحت) on the Lebanese Future Television channel.

Awards
Being Osama has won international awards including:
Best Documentary at the University Film and Video Conference
Best Documentary award at the Big Muddy Film Festival at Southern Illinois University
An Aurora Award (for Best Documentary) at the Canadian National Youth Film Festival
Certificate of Merit for fighting racism from the Canadian Race Relations Foundation.

See also
 List of cultural references to the September 11 attacks
 Where in the World Is Osama Bin Laden?

References

External links 
 
 Veritas Films
 Review on Qantara
 Interview in The Montreal Mirror

Canadian documentary films
Documentary films about racism in Canada
Documentary films about the September 11 attacks
2004 films
2004 documentary films
Arab-Canadian culture
Documentary films about words and language
Documentary films about Montreal
Anti-Arabism in North America
Stereotypes of Arab people
2000s English-language films
2000s Canadian films